Operation Thunderbolt, known in Israel as Mivtsa Yonatan (literally "Operation Jonathan"), also called Entebbe: Operation Thunderbolt in the US, is a 1977 Israeli film directed by Menahem Golan and stars Klaus Kinski, Yehoram Gaon and Sybil Danning. The film is based on an actual event – the hijacking of a flight by terrorists and the freeing of Israeli hostages on July 4, 1976. The operation was known as (Operation Entebbe, military code name: "Operation Thunderbolt") at Entebbe Airport in Uganda. Operation Thunderbolt follows the events following the flight's takeoff until the hostages' return to Israel.

Plot
On June 27, 1976, four terrorists belonging to a splinter group of the Popular Front for the Liberation of Palestine under the orders of Wadie Haddad boarded and hijacked Flight 139, an Air France Airbus A300 in Athens, Greece. Two of the terrorists are West Germans named Wilfried Boese and Halima, and the other two are Palestinians.

After landing to refuel in Libya, the four hijackers force the airliner to take off once again. With President Idi Amin's permission, the terrorists divert the airliner and its hostages to Entebbe Airport in Uganda. The hijackers are joined at Entebbe by more Palestinian militants. After identifying Israeli passengers, the non-Jewish passengers are freed while a series of demands are made, including the release of 40 Palestinian militants held in Israel, in exchange for the hostages.

The Cabinet of Israel, unwilling to give in to terrorist demands, is faced with difficult decisions as their deliberations lead to a top-secret military raid.

While still negotiating with the terrorists, who now numbered seven individuals, the Israeli military prepared a group of Lockheed C-130 Hercules transports for the raid. The transports landed at Entebbe Airport under the cover of darkness. The commandos led by Brigadier General Dan Shomron had to contend with a large armed Ugandan military detachment and used a ruse to overcome the defenses. A black Mercedes limousine had been carried on board and was used to fool sentries that it was the official car that President Amin used on an impromptu visit to the airport.

Nearly complete surprise was achieved but a firefight resulted, ending with all seven terrorists and 45 Ugandan soldiers killed. The hostages were gathered together and most were quickly put on the idling C-130 aircraft. During the raid, one commando (the breach unit commander Yonatan Netanyahu, brother of future Prime Minister Benjamin Netanyahu), and three of the hostages, died. 

With 102 hostages aboard and on their way to freedom, a group of Israeli commandos remained behind to destroy the Ugandan Air Force MiG-17 and MiG-21 fighters to prevent a retaliation. All the survivors of the attack force then joined in flying to Nairobi for refueling and then back to Israel via Sharm El Sheikh.

Cast

 Yehoram Gaon as Lt.Col. Yonatan Netanyahu
 Klaus Kinski as Wilfried Bose
 Sybil Danning as Halima
 Gila Almagor as Nurit Aviv
 Assi Dayan as Shuki (based on Muki Betser)
 Arik Lavie as Brig-Gen. Dan Shomron
 Shaike Ophir as Gadi Arnon
  as Gabriel
 Shmuel Rodensky as Dr Weissberg
  as Shlomo Bar David
  as Alma Levi
  as Dora Bloch
 Heli Goldenberg as Dalia Cohen
  as Mr. Borovitz
  as Ida Borovitz
  as Ze'ev
  as General Benny Peled, Commander of the Israel Air Force
  as Dr Avner Tal
  as Shlomo Bloch
  as Yehuda Goldstein
  as German Doctor
 Uzi Cohen as Israel soldier dressed as Idi Amin (uncredited)
 Heinz Bernard as Mr Kohan (uncredited)
  as Yitzchak Bloch
 Arie Gardus as Maj-Gen Yekutiel Adam, overall operation commander 
 Mark Heath as Idi Amin Dada
 Henry Czarniak as Michel Bacos
  as Dan Zamir, government spokesman
  as Ram Weissberg (Based on Jean-Jacques Maimoni)
 Yitzchak Rabin as himself
 Shimon Peres as himself
 Yigal Allon as himself
 Gad Yaakobi as himself

Production
Pre-production on a Hollywood film began shortly after the actual raid had taken place. With a projected large budget, and efforts to land Steve McQueen in a leading role, the project collapsed. At that point, Menahem Golan as director and co-producer, Yoram Globus also as co-producer and Ken Globus as screenwriter, took over the aborted project.

The Golan/Globus team made a decision to achieve a near-documentary feel to the proposed film. Utilizing a full-scale outdoor set consisting of control tower and terminal, the recreated Entebbe Airport also had a collection of realistic scale models of the Ugandan Air Force MiG-17 and MiG-21 fighters. Three of the four Hercules transports that were flown in the raid are seen in the film.

Operation Thunderbolt was produced with the co-operation of the Israeli Air Force and the Israeli government. The film features original footage of prominent politicians such as Yitzhak Rabin, Shimon Peres and Yigal Allon, although scenes with Peres being briefed by Yonatan Netanyahu's team and a hostage's father talking to Rabin feature a stand-in whose face is not seen. The exterior scenes set in Uganda were photographed near Eilat, Israel. Nearly all of the extras portraying Ugandan soldiers were played by Ethiopian Jewish immigrants. The scenes featuring the Knesset were filmed in Jerusalem, and the Tel Aviv airport sequences were filmed at Ben Gurion International Airport.

Originally filmed with all characters speaking in Hebrew, French, German, Arabic, or English per role, Operation Thunderbolt was shot a second time concurrently in an all-English version for the international market. With permission from the Globus Group, a number of documentaries on the rescue use footage from the film, alongside dramatizations of the events.

Music
Dubi Zeltzer composed the film score. Yehoram Gaon performed the theme song, "Eretz Tzvi" (Land of the Deer) with lyrics by Talma Alyagon Raz. Like the film, "Eretz Tzvi" would become a famous song as well. In 2014, Gaon and Raz collaborated to make a new version of the song, with new lyrics inserted in honor of Roi Klein.

Reception
Operation Thunderbolt was well received in its native Israel and was somewhat successful overseas. Of the three films that appeared, Operation Thunderbolt was the most accurate with an authentic feel coming from the use of period-accurate uniforms, weapons, aircraft and vehicles. In 1978, the film was released theatrically in the UK, and in the same year, it was nominated for an Academy Award for Best Foreign Language Film.

Home media
Although Operation Thunderbolt had some VHS releases over the years, Israeli video company SISU Home Entertainment released a special 25th anniversary two-disc DVD set of the movie in 2003. The set contains the movie with original multilingual audio and English subtitles on one disc and a 60-minute documentary about the raid on the other, plus a letter by Prime Minister Benjamin Netanyahu on his brother's role in the operation.

See also

 Raid on Entebbe
 Victory at Entebbe
 7 Days in Entebbe
 List of submissions to the 50th Academy Awards for Best Foreign Language Film
 List of Israeli submissions for the Academy Award for Best Foreign Language Film

References

Notes

Citations

Bibliography

 Barron, Colin N. Planes on Film: Ten Favourite Aviation Films. Stirling, UK: Extremis Publishing, 2016. .

External links
 
 

1977 films
Docudrama films
1970s action thriller films
Aviation films
Cultural depictions of Idi Amin
1970s English-language films
English-language Israeli films
Films about the Israel Defense Forces
Films about aircraft hijackings
Films about terrorism in Africa
Films directed by Menahem Golan
Films set in 1976
Films set in Athens
Films set in Uganda
Films set in airports
Films set on airplanes
Films shot in Israel
Golan-Globus films
1970s Hebrew-language films
Operation Entebbe
Films about battles and military operations
Films produced by Menahem Golan
Films with screenplays by Menahem Golan
Films produced by Yoram Globus
1977 multilingual films
Israeli multilingual films